The Unintentional Kidnapping of Mrs. Elfriede Ott is a 2010 Austrian comedy film directed by Andreas Prochaska.

Cast 
 Michael Ostrowski as Toni Cantussi
 Elfriede Ott as Elfriede Ott
  as Horst Wippel
 Gerhard Liebmann as Gerry Dirschl
  as Vroni Polster
 Simon Hatzl as Gruppeninspektor Karl Kramer
  as Reinhard Meinhard Ott

References

External links 

2010 comedy films
2010 films
Austrian comedy films